Sathi Leelavathi may refer to:
 Sathi Leelavathi (1936 film), a 1936 Tamil film directed by Ellis R. Dungan
 Sathi Leelavathi (1995 film), a 1995 Tamil comedy film written and directed by Balu Mahendra
 Sathi Leelavathi, a novel by S. S. Vasan and source for the 1936 film